
The Ostroh Castle (Ostroz'kyi zamok) is a castle in the city of Ostroh, located in the Rivne Oblast of western Ukraine. In the 14th, 15th and 16th centuries, the castle was the key stronghold of the powerful House of Ostroh. Today it is in ruins.

Location 
The castle itself is located in a relatively small elevated oval plaza. The area's natural geography helped to fortify the complex; the southern and eastern sides of the fortress raised upon a 20-meter high cliff, and the northern and western sides separate the city by series of trenches (moats) that replaced the big ravine.

History 
The first wooden fortifications were built in the area before the 1241 Mongol invasion of Rus, during which they were subsequently destroyed. The ruins were later reconstructed by Knyaz Daniil from the Ostrogski family on the city's Sudovy Hill (castle hill). Since then, more additions and reconstructions were carried out, although the complex still retains its Medieval architecture.

The castle complex consists of four main structures: the Guard Tower (Vezha murovana) where the castle's museum is located, the Bohoyavlenska Church, the New Tower, and the Belltower (constructed in 1905).

Legacy 
A small park sits right next to the castle, separated by a small moat. A monument was placed in the park in 1978, commemorating the 400 anniversary of the foundation of the Ostroh Academy. A building used to stand in the same location, in which the "Azbuka" (alphabet) and the Ostrog Bible were printed by Ivan Fedorov.

See also
 Seven Wonders of Ukraine
 Starokostiantyniv Castle - another castle of the Ostrogski family

External links

 
 
 
 

Castles in Ukraine
Historic house museums in Ukraine
Museums in Rivne Oblast
Gothic architecture in Ukraine
Ostrogski family
Buildings and structures in Rivne Oblast